Every Kid in a Park is a program run by the United States National Park Service in which fourth graders in the country receive free admission to National Parks. The program was created by Barack Obama in 2015 and has been renewed annually every year since.

Overview
On February 19, 2015, President Obama announced the initiative. The initiative was launched in the fall of 2015 to coincide with the one hundredth anniversary of the National Park Service. The National Park Service gives all United States students in the fourth grade and their families an annual pass for free admission. Areas of admission include national parks, forests, monuments, and wildlife refuges. Around the time of the announcement of the initiative, annual passes to national parks generally cost $80.

Cost coverage for the free passes will come from the National Park Service's $20-million budget for youth engagement programs. The National Park Foundation and National Park Service will provide transportation grants and educational materials to schools, with a focus on schools that have greater need. Such transportation grants are part of the National Park Foundation's "Ticket to Ride" program. Resources will also be provided to facilitate the location of nearby parks and supporting youth programs.

Criticism of the initiative includes concern over a possible increase in National Parks' reliance on Congress. Another concern of the initiative is of its cost, but one source from The Washington Post projects that only $2.3 million in revenue will be lost.

Fourth-graders were specifically chosen for "logistical, educational and instructional reasons", according to a White House official. The National Park Service as well as other public agencies already have fourth grade programs in place. Furthermore, many states within the United States teach state history during fourth grade, so National Park programs are relevant to the grade. Other reasons include ease in coordination of trips by a student's one teacher (rather than multiple teachers, as present in higher grades) and the idea of youth building early connections with nature.

The Every Kid in a Park website everykidinapark.gov was designed and developed by 18F.

The Every Kid in a Park website everykidinapark.org was designed and developed by Sub Rosa.

The John D. Dingell, Jr. Conservation, Management, and Recreation Act, signed in March 2019, included the Every Kid Outdoors Act, which authorized the program for 7 years.

See also
United States National Park
United States National Park Service
National Park Foundation
Let's Move!

References

Bibliography

External links

The National Park Foundation Official Website: Centennial webpage

National Park Service
Government services web portals in the United States